Howard Township is one of the twenty-one townships of Tama County, Iowa, United States.

Townships in Tama County, Iowa
Townships in Iowa